Sir Walter Bagot, 3rd Baronet (21 March 1644 – 15 February 1704), a barrister and landowner, succeeded to the title 3rd Baronet of Blithfield Hall, Staffordshire, on the death of his father Sir Edward Bagot in 1673.

He was educated at Christ Church, Oxford, and was called to the Middle Temple bar in 1666.

He served, like his father before him, as Member of Parliament for Staffordshire, England, from 1678 to 1695.

He married Jane Salesbury in June 1670 and had 5 sons and 5 daughters. He was succeeded by their son Edward Bagot. His daughter Elizabeth married Henry Paget, 1st Earl of Uxbridge, his daughter Jane married Morris Jones of Llanrhyadr, Denbighshire and later John Roberts, MP.
His eldest daughter Mary (1672-1727) married Sir George Parker, 2nd Baronet in 1692.

References

1644 births
1704 deaths
Baronets in the Baronetage of England
18th-century English landowners
Alumni of Christ Church, Oxford
Members of the Middle Temple
17th-century English lawyers
English MPs 1679
English MPs 1680–1681
English MPs 1681
English MPs 1685–1687
English MPs 1689–1690
English MPs 1690–1695